Rijsenhout is a village in the Dutch province of North Holland. It is a part of the municipality of Haarlemmermeer, and lies about 6 km southeast of Hoofddorp. In 2001, the village of Rijsenhout had 3072 inhabitants. The built-up area of the town was 0.63 km², and contained 1237 residences. The wider statistical area of Rijsenhout has a population of around 4540.

References

Populated places in North Holland
Haarlemmermeer